The Fujifilm FinePix S2000HD is a discontinued 2008 digital camera from Fujifilm's FinePix S-series. It has a 10 megapixel CCD sensor. It is the earliest Fujifilm camera fully compatible with high-definition video.

Reception
In a review by CNET, the S2000HD received 6.6 points. This rating was mainly justified because of slow performance, visible image noise even at low ISO sensitivities and a mediocre electronic viewfinder. Contrarily, the camera's "compact, comfortable design" and comparatively low price were listed as positives.

References

S2000HD
Cameras introduced in 2008
Bridge digital cameras